Phonte Lyshod Coleman, known mononymously as Phonte (born December 28, 1978), is an American rapper, singer, and producer. He is currently of the North Carolina hip-hop trio/duo Little Brother (revived in 2019 without producer 9th Wonder) and one-half of the duo The Foreign Exchange. He has also recorded R&B-flavored output as a singer (often under the pseudonym Percy Miracles), and with Nicolay on The Foreign Exchange. His rhymes tend to be no-frill perspectives on working-class life.

Career

Little Brother

Phonte first met the other members of Little Brother, rapper Big Pooh and producer 9th Wonder, in 1998 while attending North Carolina Central University, as an English major. The three shared common musical interests and decided to form a group. "Speed", the group's first song recorded together, led to them signing a deal with the independent ABB Records, and recording their debut album, The Listening. The album's success led to the group signing a non-exclusive deal with major label Atlantic Records.

The group's 2005 album, The Minstrel Show, was a concept album dealing with the current state of hip hop music. The album received a positive critical reaction but very little commercial success. During the recording of their third album, the group announced the departure of 9th Wonder on amicable terms, as well as a parting of ways with their label. Through a contractual clause they landed back on ABB Records and released Getback in late 2007.

The Foreign Exchange
Phonte met Dutch producer Nicolay virtually on an OkayPlayer message board. The duo released their debut album, Connected, having never met face to face.  The Foreign Exchange has released four albums and has garnered a Grammy nomination for Best Urban/Alternative Performance for the track "Daykeeper" (featuring Muhsinah) from the second album, Leave It All Behind.

Solo work
Phonte has appeared on numerous records by other artists, often as a vocalist. He made a guest appearance on the song "Beats N' Rhymes" from producer Kev Brown's album "I Do What I Do", and has also recorded tracked with producer Oddisee, both members of the Washington D.C. (DMV)-based Low Budget collective. In 2006, he was featured on producer DJ Shadow's The Outsider album. In the following year he contributed vocals to rap group Playaz Circle's song "Paper Chaser", from their album Supply & Demand. Phonte's recent projects include The Foreign Exchange's third album, Authenticity, as well as a collaboration (as Tiggalo) with Detroit-based musician Zo! titled  Zo! & Tigallo Love the 80s. The latter of these is intended as an homage to early 1980s R&B and pop music and features covers of popular songs such as a-Ha's "Take On Me", Toto's "Africa", and Joe Jackson's "Stepping Out". He appeared on RJD2's 2013 album More Is Than Isn't.

He released his solo-debut titled Charity Starts at Home on September 27, 2011 through FE Music. His second album, No News Is Good News, was released on March 2, 2018.

Discography

Studio albums

Collaborative albums

Extended plays

With Little Brother 

 The Listening (2003)
 The Minstrel Show (2005)
 Getback (2007)
 Leftback (2010)
 May the Lord Watch (2019)

With The Foreign Exchange 
 Connected (2004)
 Leave It All Behind (2008)
 Authenticity (2010)
 Love in Flying Colors (2013)
 Tales from the Land of Milk and Honey (2015)

Guest appearances

References

External links

Phonte RBMA video lecture session
Interview with Phonte and Nicolay at Leisure Lab

Living people
African-American male rappers
Rappers from North Carolina
Singers from North Carolina
Atlantic Records artists
Record producers from North Carolina
Musicians from Durham, North Carolina
American hip hop singers
American contemporary R&B singers
1978 births
21st-century American rappers
21st-century American male singers
21st-century American singers
21st-century African-American male singers
21st-century American male musicians
21st-century African-American musicians
20th-century African-American people